Tomi Adenlé, better known as Tazer is a DJ, record producer, re-mixer and composer from Oxford, England.

Biography
Tazer is an Oxford-raised, London-based artist and DJ. He started out in 2014 with a string of releases on various house music labels including Recess Recordings and Black Butter Records. In 2015, Tazer was eventually signed to Black Butter Records, a subsidiary of Sony Music.

In 2015, Tazer released "Wet Dollars". The song featured a sample from The Notorious B.I.G and the vocals of XXL's 2015 freshman class rapper and singer, Tink. It was released in August of that year The song was also accompanied with a music video set in New York City which debut on MTV a week later. A Wet Dollars remix EP was also released featuring Remixes from Redlight, Melé, MSCLS and Zeds Dead.

He has also remixed artists such as Crookers, Ellie Goulding and Maverick Sabre

In November 2015, Tazer also released the video for his planned second single "Vibrate". The song made it to Number 1 on BBC Radio 1's official dance chart as well as being added to the playlist of BBC Radio 1Xtra. It was planned for a 2016 debut but was never released.

In 2017, Tazer's second single, "Rave Slave" was released via Beatport through Tough Love's label Get Twisted Records.

Discography

Extended plays

Singles

Remixes

References

External links
 

1991 births
Living people
English electronic musicians
musicians from Oxford